Tanga may refer to:

Places

Burkina Faso
 , a town in eastern Burkina Faso
 Tanga, Sidéradougou, a village in western Burkina Faso
 Tanga-Pela, a village in northern-central Burkina Faso

Other places
 Tanga, Tanzania, a city and port on the coast of Tanzania
 Tanga Airport
 Tanga Region, Tanzanian administrative region named after the city
 Tanga District, Tanzanian district
 Tanga Islands, an island group in Papua New Guinea
 Tånga och Rögle, a village in southern Sweden

Money
 Tanga (coin), subunit of the Portuguese Indian rupia from the 16th-century until 1958
 Tanga (currency), subunit of the Tajikistani ruble from 1995 to 2000

Entertainment
 Tanga (film), a 1987 Brazilian comedy film
 "Tangá", a 1943 pioneering Afro-Cuban jazz composition by Mario Bauzá

Other
 1595 Tanga, a main-belt asteroid discovered in 1930, named after Tanga, Tanzania
 Battle of Tanga, an unsuccessful British attack to capture the Tanzanian city and German East Africa during World War I
 Tanga (clothing), a minimal style of bikini, with triangular front and rear and elastic sides
 Tanga Cement, a cement company of Tanzania, named after the city
 Tanga language, a Bantu language of Cameroon and Equatorial Guinea
 Tanga Station, a monorail station in Kitakyushu, Japan

See also 
 Tamga, an abstract seal or stamp used by Eurasian nomadic peoples
 Tamga (genus), a Precambrian fossil organism
 Tangga language, an Oceanic language
 Tango (disambiguation)
 Tanka (disambiguation)
 Thanga, a village in Manipur, India
 Tonga (disambiguation)